The 44th Division, now known as the 44th Airborne Division, is a military formation of the People's Liberation Army and People's Liberation Army Air Force of the People's Republic of China. It is now a training formation of PLA 15th Airborne Corps.

History 
The 44th Division was created in February 1949 under the Regulation of the Redesignations of All Organizations and Units of the Army, issued by Central Military Commission on November 1, 1948, basing on the 26th Brigade, 9th Column of PLA Zhongyuan Field Army, formed in late 1946.

The division was a part of 15th Corps. It took part in the Chinese civil war under the flag of 44th Division.

In March 1951 the division entered Korea as a part of People's Volunteer Army and took part in the Fifth Phase Offensive in 1951 and the Battle of Triangle Hill. It suffered heavy casualties to American forces at the Battle of Hwacheon. It marked the end of the Chinese Spring Offensive.

In May 1954 the division returned from Korea with the Corps HQ, renamed as 44th Infantry Division of the National Defense Force. It was stationed at Guangshui, Hubei province. By then the division was composed of:

 130th Infantry Regiment
 131st Infantry Regiment
 132nd Infantry Regiment
 324th Artillery Regiment

In April 1960 the division was renamed as the 44th Army Division.

On June 1st, 1961, the division was converted to an Airborne Division, renaming itself as the 44th Airborne Division. The division was then transferred to the Air Force, along with the now 15th Airborne Corps. The division was composed then of:
 130th Airborne Regiment;
 131st Airborne Regiment;
 132nd Airborne Regiment;
 324th Artillery Regiment.

In July 1967, during the Wuhan Incident, 132nd Airborne Regiment, 44th Airborne Division relieved and disarmed the mutinous Independent Division of Hubei Provincial Military District.

In December 1969 its 324th Artillery Regiment was renamed as Artillery Regiment, 44th Airborne Division.

In 1975 and 1983 all airborne divisions were reduced. In 1983 the division's 130th Regiment was re-organized as a catalogue B training unit.

In May 1985 the division was reduced to 44th Airborne Brigade, which consisted of three airborne battalions, one artillery battalion, one anti-tank battalion and one anti-aircraft battalion. The brigade was an Emergency Mobile Unit from 1985 to 1992.

From May 1985 to June 1986 Reconnaissance Company, 44th Airborne Brigade took part in the Battle of Laoshan as a part of 7th Reconnaissance Group. It took part in the enforced martial law and the crack down on protests in Beijing, June 1989.

In 1992 the brigade was expanded to the 44th Airborne Division again. Since then the division is composed of:

 130th Airborne Regiment
 131st Airborne Regiment
 Yingshan Air Force Station

References

Infantry divisions of the People's Liberation Army
Military units and formations established in 1949
1949 establishments in China